"The Rapper" is a song by The Jaggerz, written by band member Donnie Iris. Released as a single, it reached No. 2 on the Billboard Pop Singles chart, behind Simon & Garfunkel's smash "Bridge Over Troubled Water" and it was certified Gold by the RIAA in 1970 (see 1970 in music) for selling over a million copies.

Background
The song is addressed to a girl, or girls in general; it describes the method of a man who seduces women with untruths ("rapping"). The singer says, "You know what he's after"; he concludes by saying there comes a point at which the man has his target where he wants her, and the girl has to "face reality".  The record ends with a small burst of applause heard in the studio.

The "rapper" of the title and "rappin'" in the lyrics have only some coincidental resemblance to the vocal style of rapping.

Chart performance

Weekly charts

Year-end charts

Covers 
"The Rapper" has been covered by two Jaggerz members. Since beginning his solo career, Donnie Iris has covered the song numerous times in concert. Additionally, live recordings of the song have appeared on his compilation albums.

Also, "The Rapper" was covered by Jimmie Ross during the time period when The Jaggerz weren't together. Additionally, the single was covered by Wolfman Jack. Canadian hard rock trio Santers recorded the song for their 1981 debut album Shot Down In Flames.

Album appearances 
 We Went to Different Schools Together, 1970 (The Jaggerz)
 Live! At Nick's Fat City, 1998 (Donnie Iris)
 20th Century Masters: The Millennium Collection: The Best of Donnie Iris, 2001 (Donnie Iris)
 Re-Rapped by Request, 2001 (The Jaggerz)
 Ah! Live!, 2009 (Donnie Iris)
 Full Circle, 2010 (Jimmie Ross)

See also
 List of 1970s one-hit wonders in the United States

References

1970 singles
1970 songs
Donnie Iris songs
Kama Sutra Records singles